Nicholas Alexander, (died November 1364) was a Voivode of Wallachia (c. 1352 – November 1364), after having been co-ruler to his father Basarab I.

Reign 

In the year 1359, he founded the Eastern Orthodox Metropolis of Ungro-Wallachia.

After initially resisting pressures to become the Kingdom of Hungary's vassal, he yielded to King Louis I in 1354, and recognized the right of the Roman Catholic Church to establish missions in his principality, as well as the privilege of Saxon traders from Brașov to transit Wallachia without paying duties. In 1355, Nicolae Alexandru and the King of Hungary reached an agreement in return for Severin.

Nicholas Alexander died in 16 November 1364 and he was buried in Câmpulung. His epitaph reads:
In the 16th day of November died the great and sole ruler Io Nicholas Alexander voivode, son of great Basarab, in 6873 indiction 3. Memory eternal.

Family 
Firstly, he married Lady Maria, of the magyar Lackfi family located in Transylvania.The couple had two children:
Prince Voislav ( d. January 1366)
Princesa Elizabeth of Wallachia (1340– 1369),  who married Duke of Opole Vladislaus II and had three daughters.
Through Elizabeth's youngest daughter, Katarina of Oppole, Nicolas Alexander become ancestor for all European royal families including Romanian royal family.

His second wife was Clara Dobokai, a Catholic noblewoman from Hungary. The marriage produced three children:
Princess Ana of Wallachia, the Empress Consort of Bulgaria; married her cousin Tsar Ivan Sratsimir of Bulgaria and had three children, including the next tsar, Prince Constantine
Voievode Radu I of Wallachia, succeeded his half brother Vladislav as voievode
Princess Anna of Wallachia, the Empress Consort of Serbia; married Emperor Stefan Uroš V

The mother of Vladislav I of Wallachia may be Clara Dobokai.

Footnotes

Bibliography 
  Constantin C. Giurescu, Istoria Românilor, vol. I, Ed. ALL Educațional, București, 2003.
  Daniel Barbu, Sur le double nom du prince de Valachie Nicolas-Alexandre, Revue Roumaine d’Histoire XXV, no. 4, 1986.

|-

1364 deaths
Rulers of Wallachia
 
Year of birth unknown
House of Basarab
People associated with Koutloumousiou Monastery